Itzy (stylized in all caps) is a South Korean girl group formed by JYP Entertainment and consisting of members Yeji, Lia, Ryujin, Chaeryeong, and Yuna. They debuted on February 12, 2019, with the release of their single album It'z Different. Their accolades include Rookie of the Year at the 34th Golden Disc Awards, New Artist of the Year at the 9th Gaon Chart Music Awards and 2019 Melon Music Awards, Best New Female Artist at the 2019 Mnet Asian Music Awards, and the New Artist Award at the 29th Seoul Music Awards; they are the first K-pop girl group to achieve such a "Rookie Grand Slam".

Career

2015–2019: Pre-debut activities
After failing to pass auditions held by Fantagio, Chaeryeong and her sister were cast by JYP Entertainment (JYP) through the K-pop Star 3 television series. In 2015, Chaeryeong participated in JYP's survival show Sixteen but did not make the final lineup of the winning girl group, Twice. The first member of Itzy to join JYP, she trained for five years. Ryujin was scouted at a Got7 concert and trained at JYP for four years prior to Itzy's debut. Both Yuna and Yeji joined JYP in 2015 and trained for three years, Yuna after being discovered by company staff and Yeji after having successfully auditioned. The final member Lia initially auditioned for SM Entertainment and passed but was forced to back out at the last minute due to a disagreement with her parents. She passed JYP auditions several years later and trained for two years.

In 2017, Yuna and Ryujin appeared in BTS' "Love Yourself" Highlight Reel. The same year, the members (except for Lia) appeared on the Mnet reality show Stray Kids as a project group alongside the boy group that would eventually be named Stray Kids. Ryujin competed on JTBC's survival show Mix Nine, placing first among the female contestants but losing to the male contestants overall. Meanwhile, Yeji participated in SBS' The Fan but was eliminated in the fifth episode.

2019: Debut with It'z Different and It'z Icy

On January 21, 2019, JYP announced that they would be debuting a new girl group, their first since Twice in 2015 and first overall idol group since Stray Kids in 2017. The label's official YouTube channel uploaded a video trailer revealing the five members.

On February 12, the group released their debut single album, It'z Different, led by the single "Dalla Dalla". The song incorporated elements from EDM sub-genres such as future house and bass house, and its empowering lyrics were well received by audiences. The group scored one of the biggest Billboard debuts for a new K-pop act in years, with "Dalla Dalla" entering at number three and peaking at number two on the World Digital Song Sales chart. The song sold 2,000 downloads in the US in the week ending February 14, according to Nielsen Music, making it the best-selling K-pop song in the country that week. "Want It?" was released alongside "Dalla Dalla" and debuted at number eight, selling 1,000 downloads. "Dalla Dalla" also debuted as the second most popular song on YouTube. Billboard confirmed that the music video for "Dalla Dalla" surpassed 17.1 million views within 24 hours of its release and broke the record for the most viewed K-pop debut music video within 24 hours. On February 21, eight days after their debut, Itzy received their first music show win on M Countdown, breaking the record for the fastest time for a girl group to achieve their first music show win. The song went on to win on music shows nine times, and its music video became the fastest K-pop debut music video to reach 100 million views on YouTube at the time.

Itzy's first extended play (EP), It'z Icy, was released on July 29, along with a music video for lead single "Icy". Commercially, the EP was a success, peaking at number three on the Gaon Album Chart. "Icy" continued the group's success on music shows, earning 12 wins, including a triple crown on Show Champion. On September 22, JYP announced Itzy's showcase tour, the Itzy Premiere Showcase Tour "Itzy? Itzy!". The tour opened in Jakarta on November 2 and visited different cities in Asia throughout the end of 2019 and the US for five shows in January 2020.

In November 2019, "Dalla Dalla" surpassed 100 million streams on Gaon Music Chart, earning the group their first platinum certification. It was the first debut song by a K-pop group to earn a platinum certification from the Korea Music Content Association (KMCA) since the introduction of certifications in April 2018. The single ranked eighth on the list of "The 20 Best K-pop Songs of 2019" compiled by Dazed, which described the group as having kept "a steady hand on the rudder using the fun touches even with the visual and sonic chaos going on around" and "the ones to give K-pop a fresh boot up". The music videos for "Dalla Dalla" and "Icy" placed on the list of South Korea's most popular music video on YouTube at numbers two and seven, respectively. At the end of the year, Itzy won several Best New Female Artist awards, including at the 2019 Melon Music Awards and the 2019 Mnet Asian Music Awards.

2020–2021: US showcase tour and continued commercial success
Itzy began the year with the US leg of their showcase tour. Their first show was on January 17, 2020, in Los Angeles. On March 9, Itzy released their second EP, It'z Me, and its lead single "Wannabe". Featuring production from Sophie and Oliver Heldens, the EP saw the group experiment with EDM sounds while continuing to explore lyrical themes of freedom, self-confidence, and individuality. It'z Me debuted at number one on South Korea's Gaon Album Chart, making it the group's first number one album in the country. It also debuted at number five on the Billboard World Albums chart, their highest position on the chart at the time. The group went on to achieve eight music show wins with "Wannabe". On August 17, 2020, Itzy released Not Shy, their third EP, as well as the music video for the lead single of the same name. Although it featured Itzy's signature "teen crush" pop sound, the album marked a lyrical shift as the group transitioned from singing about "themes of independence and self-love" to "tipping their toes into the waters of singing about love". The EP debuted at number one on the Gaon Album Chart with sales of over 219,048 copies, their second release to top the chart. Itzy promoted "Not Shy" on music shows, achieving five wins.

On March 20, 2021, Itzy released the digital single "Trust Me (Midzy)", a song dedicated to their fans, as part of their first global livestream event. On April 30, Itzy released their fourth EP Guess Who and its lead single "In the Morning". the song debuted and peaked at number 22 on the Billboard Global Excl. U.S. chart and also at number 34 on the Global 200 chart, becoming their highest entry on both. The EP entered the US Billboard 200 at number 148, making it their first appearance on the chart. Later that year, the EP was certified Platinum by Korea Music Content Association (KMCA). The English version of "In the Morning" was released on May 14.

On July 1, 2021, Second Aunt KimDaVi and Itzy released the collaborative digital single "Break Ice" under VIVO WAVE and distributed by Genie Music and Stone Music Entertainment. On September 1, it was announced that Itzy would be making their Japanese debut under Warner Japan with the EP What'z Itzy. On September 24, Itzy released their first studio album Crazy in Love and its lead single "Loco". The album debuted at number 11 on the Billboard 200, a new career high for the group. Crazy in Love was certified Platinum by the KMCA in November 2021 for selling over 250,000 copies and 2× Platinum in February 2022 for selling over 500,000 copies. On December 22, 2021, the group released a Japanese compilation album titled It'z Itzy.

2022–present: International endeavors 
On February 10, 2022, it was reported by Billboard that Republic Records and JYP Entertainment added Itzy to their strategic partnership, which initially only included Twice. On April 6, Itzy released their first Japanese single "Voltage". On July 15, Itzy released their fifth EP Checkmate and its lead single "Sneakers". It was also announced that they would embark on their first world tour, the Checkmate World Tour, with the first shows in Seoul on August 6 and 7. Itzy released their second Japanese single "Blah Blah Blah" on October 5 and their first English single "Boys Like You" on October 21. On November 30, Itzy released their sixth EP Cheshire and its lead single of the same name.

Endorsements
Itzy has advertised for various brands since their debut in 2019, when they collaborated with Kia Motors to introduce the "Soul Booster" cars in the music video of Itzy's debut single "Dalla Dalla". They subsequently released the "Itzy X Soul Booster Special Video". Itzy became one of the celebrity endorsers of Lotte Duty Free in 2019. Later that year, Itzy inked endorsement deals with clothing brand Andar and MAC Cosmetics. Itzy also endorsed local brands such as Dongseo Food and CJ CheilJedang, which collaborated with Itzy to release limited edition "Gourmet Chicken" that was promoted with the release of a theme music video on YouTube. Itzy endorsed the local contact lens brand Claren in 2021. In August 2020, Itzy collaborated with Line Friends to participate in the character development of "lifetime friends" called "WDZY" dolls representing each member.

On April 31, 2021, Maybelline New York announced that they selected ITZY as their new global spokesmodels, the first Korean and musician to be chosen as such by Maybelline New York. In March 2022, Itzy promoted the Adidas Members Week event at the Adidas Hongdae Center. They advertised the Pokémon Legends: Arceus video game and the Pokémon Card Game in January 2022, followed by Pokémon Unite in July 2022 alongside the release of the special video "Pokémon Unite / ITZY Special Show!" on July 7. On March 10, 2022, Swedish Fashion brand H&M announced that they selected Itzy as models for the brand's spring/summer campaign. On August 16, 2022, Itzy became ambassadors for the Singaporean fashion brand Charles & Keith.

Members

 Yeji – leader, dancer, vocalist, rapper
 Lia – vocalist, rapper
 Ryujin – rapper, dancer, vocalist
 Chaeryeong – dancer, vocalist, rapper
 Yuna – dancer, rapper, vocalist

Discography

 Crazy in Love (2021)

Filmography

Reality shows

Concerts

 Checkmate World Tour (2022–2023)

Awards and nominations

References

External links 

 

 
2019 establishments in South Korea
English-language singers from South Korea
Japanese-language singers of South Korea
JYP Entertainment artists
K-pop music groups
Musical groups established in 2019
Musical groups from Seoul
Musical quintets
Republic Records artists
South Korean girl groups
Warner Music Japan artists